Staroye Drozhzhanoye (İske Çüpräle; , Aslă Śĕprel) is a rural locality (a selo) and the administrative center of Drozhzhanovsky District in Tatarstan, Russia. Population:

References

Rural localities in Tatarstan
Buinsky Uyezd